Yevgeni Alekseyevich Alfyorov (born 31 January 1995) is a Russian football defender.

Club career
He made his professional debut in the Russian Professional Football League for FC Zenit-2 St. Petersburg on 15 July 2013 in a game against FC Tosno.

He made his Russian Premier League debut on 21 March 2015 for FC Arsenal Tula in a game against PFC CSKA Moscow.

References

External links
 

1995 births
People from Taldykorgan
Living people
Russian footballers
Russia youth international footballers
Association football defenders
Russian Premier League players
FC Arsenal Tula players
FC Khimki players
FC Dynamo Saint Petersburg players
FC Zenit Saint Petersburg players
FC Chayka Peschanokopskoye players
FC Zenit-2 Saint Petersburg players